The 32nd International Emmy Awards took place on November 22, 2004, at the Hilton Hotel in New York City, United States, and hosted by the Irish comedian Graham Norton.

Ceremony 
The nominees for the 32nd Emmy International Awards were announced by International Academy of Television Arts and Sciences, on October 4, 2004, at a press conference at MIPCOM in Cannes.

British productions were the big winners of the 2004 International Emmy, winning six of the seven categories, including best documentary and best drama series. The BBC took the prize for best drama with Waking the Dead and best art program with George Orwell: A Life in Pictures.

Channel 4, also from the United Kingdom won an Emmy in the category for documentary The Boy Whose Skin Fell Off. The Emmy for best entertainment program without script was to Brat Camp, and The Illustrated Mum was named best children's program. A production exhibited by ITV about Henry VIII was awarded as the best miniseries. Berlin, Berlin, won the award for best comedy, the only award granted to a non-British work.

The Directorate Award was given to Herbert Kloiber, managing director of the Tele München Group. The Founders Award was delivered to MTV for its contribution to the fight against AIDS and for revolutionizing music on television. The Emmy Ted Cott was delivered to Australian Len Mauger of Nine Network, for their dedication to the International Academy of Television Arts and Sciences in the United States.

Winners

Most major nominations 
By country
 — 11
 — 4
 — 4

By network
Channel 4 — 6
BBC — 4

Most major awards 
By country
 — 6

By network
Channel 4 — 3
BBC — 2

References

External links 
 
 Heady ‘Times’ in Intl. Emmy noms

International Emmy Awards ceremonies
2004 television awards
2004 in American television